Mei may refer to:

Arts and entertainment
 Mei (film), a 2019 Tamil thriller
 Mei (album), by Echolyn, 2002

People
 Mei (surname), including a list of people with the surname
 Mei (given name), including a list of people and fictional characters with the given name

Places
 Mei County, Shaanxi, China
 Mei County, Guangdong, China
 Mei Pass, Guangdong, a mountain pass
 Mei River, Guangdong
 Eiras e Mei, a civil parish of Arcos de Valdevez, Portugal

Other uses
 Mei (dinosaur), a genus of bird-like Chinese dinosaur
 Methyl iodide, MeI, a chemical compound
 Midob language of Sudan, ISO 639-3 language code mei
 Prunus mume, or mei, the Chinese plum

See also
 Mei Mei, a 2009 short film 
 MEI (disambiguation)
 Persian wine, or mey